Vila Nova de Paiva is a municipality in the district Viseu in Portugal. The population in 2011 was 5,176, in an area of 175.53 km2.

The present mayor is Manuel Marques Custódio, elected by the Social Democratic Party. The municipal holiday is March 2.

Parishes

Administratively, the municipality is divided into 5 civil parishes (freguesias):
 Pendilhe
 Queiriga
 Touro
 Vila Cova à Coelheira
 Vila Nova de Paiva, Alhais e Fráguas

Notable people 
 Cláudio Ramos (born 1991 in Vila Nova de Paiva) a football goalkeeper for FC Porto; spent most of his career with Tondela with 267 club caps

References

External links
Municipality official website
Photos from Vila Nova de Paiva

Populated places in Viseu District
Municipalities of Viseu District